Ishita may mean:
Ishita Malaviya, a female Indian surfer
Ishita Moitra, a screenwriter based in Mumbai, India
Ishita Panchal (born 1 December 1998), an Indian Bollywood and television child actress
Ishita Sharma, an Indian actress
Ishita Syed, Pakistani model and actress
Ishita Vyas (original name Manju Vyas), an Indian television and film actress
Rumana Rashid Ishita, a Bangladeshi actress